Landstraße  is a station on  and  of the Vienna U-Bahn. It is located in the Landstraße District. It opened in 1991.

Art

Found in this station are:

 "Planet der Pendler mit den drei Zeitmonden" by Kurt Hofstetter 
 "Emailwand" by Oswald Oberhuber

References

Buildings and structures in Landstraße
Railway stations opened in 1991
Vienna U-Bahn stations
1991 establishments in Austria
Railway stations in Austria opened in the 20th century

de:U-Bahn-Station Landstraße